The rosy minivet (Pericrocotus roseus) is a species of bird in the family Campephagidae. The male is distinguished from other minivets by having a deep pink/light red shade in wings and tail and the female having an olive/olive yellow rump as against bright yellow in other minivets. Both male and female are grey above.

Distribution
It is found in Afghanistan, Bangladesh, Bhutan, China, India, Laos, Myanmar, Nepal, Pakistan, Thailand, and Vietnam. In India, it is found in the Himalayas from west to east to Arunachal Pradesh and hills of Nagaland and Manipur. In winter in peninsula.
Its natural habitats are subtropical or tropical moist lowland forest, and subtropical or tropical moist montane forest.

References

Gallery 

rosy minivet
Birds of the Himalayas
Birds of South China
Birds of Myanmar
Birds of Yunnan
rosy minivet
Taxa named by Louis Jean Pierre Vieillot
Taxonomy articles created by Polbot